{{Infobox military conflict
| conflict          = Republican insurgency in Afghanistan
| width             = 
| partof            = the Afghanistan conflict (1978–present)
| image             = TalibaninPanjshir2.png
| alt               = 
| caption           = Taliban fighters in Panjshir on 11 September 2021
| date              = 17 August 2021 – present()
| place             = Panjshir, Parwan, Baghlan, Wardak, Daykundi, Samangan, and Balkh provinces, Afghanistan
| coordinates       = 
| map_type          = 
| map_relief        = 
| map_size          = 
| map_marksize      = 
| map_caption       = 
| map_label         = 
| territory         = Taliban captures the Panjshir Valley, NRF controls no territory
| result            = 
| status            = Ongoing as a hit-and-run campaign
| combatant1        = 
 Taliban
 Haqqani network
 al-Qaeda (alleged)| combatant2        =  loyalists
  National Resistance Front (NRF)
 Ahmad Khan Samangani Front
 Afghanistan Freedom Front
 Afghanistan Islamic National & Liberation Movement
 Many smaller factions
Supported by: (alleged)

Independent militias and Taliban dissidents
| commander1        = 
| commander2        = 
| units1            = Army of the Islamic Emirate of Afghanistan
 Badri 313 Battalion
 Taliban special forces (including ex-Red Unit)
Various pro-Taliban militiasForeign Mujahideens (possibly affiliated with al-Qaeda)

 Afghan National Security Forces remnants
 Afghan National Army remnants
 Afghan Air Force remnants
 Ahmad Massoud's militia
 Andarab Resistance Front
Various non-NRF militias
 Anti-Taliban Hazara militias
 Mehdi Mujahid's militia
| strength1         = 60,000–260,000 Taliban armed forces overall
| strength2         = 2,000–10,000 (Panjshir resistance; estimates)
  9,000 (Ahmad Massoud's forces; self-claim)
Unknown number of independent militias
| casualties1       = NRF claim: 950+ killed, 1,500+ captured
| casualties2       = Heavy casualtiesIEA claims: Large number of POWs, vehicles and weapons also captured
| casualties3       = 
| notes             = 
| campaignbox       = 
}}
The republican insurgency in Afghanistan is an ongoing armed conflict between the National Resistance Front and allied groups which fight under the banner of the Islamic Republic of Afghanistan on one side, and the Islamic Emirate of Afghanistan (the state controlled by the Taliban) on the other side. On 17 August 2021, former first vice president of Afghanistan Amrullah Saleh declared himself the "caretaker" president of Afghanistan and announced the resistance. On 26 August, a brief ceasefire was declared. On 1 September, talks broke down and fighting resumed as the Taliban attacked resistance positions.

, in addition to the opposition in the Panjshir, there were also districts in the centre of Afghanistan that still resisted the Taliban, supported by ethnic and religious minorities. On 6 September, the Taliban took control of most of the Panjshir province, with resistance fighters retreating to the mountains to continue fighting within the province. Clashes in the valley mostly ceased mid-September, while resistance leaders Amrullah Saleh and Ahmad Massoud fled to neighboring Tajikistan. Despite these developments, NRF holdouts continued to fight, still waging a guerrilla campaign in several provinces including Baghlan, Balkh, Badakhshan, and Faryab by early 2022. In addition, an independent anti-Taliban militia still held territory in Samangan Province as of December 2021.  the NRF controls no territory but continues to carry out hit and run guerrilla attacks.

Background

Historically, the Panjshir Valley was known for its natural defences. Surrounded by the Hindu Kush mountains, Panjshir never fell to the Soviets during the invasion of the 1980s nor to the Taliban during the civil war of the early 1990s. In the war of 1996–2001, Panjshir was a center of the anti-Taliban Northern Alliance. In these conflicts, Panjshir was under the leadership of Ahmad Shah Massoud who was killed by a suicide bomber in 2001. Soon after, the United States invasion of Afghanistan resulted in the overthrow of the previously dominant, Taliban-led Islamic Emirate of Afghanistan and the eventual establishment of the Islamic Republic of Afghanistan. Massoud and his family remained highly respected in Panjshir in the next two decades.

The traditional anti-Taliban sentiment of the Panjshiris has an ethnic dimension: A majority of the population of the Panjshir Valley are ethnic Tajik people, while the majority of the Taliban are Pashtuns. However, these ethnic differences became less pronounced in course of the Taliban insurgency, as the Taliban began to recruit Tajiks into their ranks.

In 2021, the Taliban overran most of Afghanistan in a lightning offensive; Panjshir Province was the only area which was able to resist until the offensive's conclusion. However, the valley's ability to withstand future Taliban assaults was hampered by it being cut off from outside support. In the 1980s and 1990s, Panjshir's forces had been able to keep supply lines to Tajikistan open. These were not accessible in the 2021 conflict, as the Taliban had successfully taken most of northern Afghanistan. Regardless, the former Islamic Republic of Afghanistan initially continued to exercise de facto control over the Panjshir Valley, which was described by The Week as "the only region out of [the] Taliban's hands" as of August 2021. Former loyalists to the old republic fled to Panjshir, hoping to transform it into an anti-Taliban stronghold.

Saleh and Massoud's announcements
On 17 August 2021, Saleh—citing provisions of the Constitution of Afghanistan—declared himself President of Afghanistan from the Panjshir Valley, and vowed to continue military operations against the Taliban from there. His claim to the presidency was endorsed by Ahmad Massoud and Islamic Republic of Afghanistan Minister of Defence Bismillah Khan Mohammadi along with the Embassy of the Islamic Republic of Afghanistan in Dushanbe. On 23 August 2021, Massoud made contact with unnamed American lawmakers.

Disposition of forces
Islamic Republic of Afghanistan and anti-Taliban militias

Prior to the fall of Kabul, Panjshiris began moving military equipment from surrounding areas, including helicopters and armored vehicles, into Panjshir Province. There, they were joined by Afghan National Army commanders and soldiers, including commandos, ex-Mujahideen who had previously served Ahmad Massoud's late father, Ahmad Shah Massoud, and other anti-Taliban activists. Most of them regrouped at Baghlan Province's Andarab District before moving to Panjshir after making their escape from Kunduz, Badakhshan, Takhar, and Baghlan. According to a Russian estimate, the disparate Anti-Taliban forces had approximately 7,000 personnel under arms as of mid August 2021. Other estimates place this number as low as 2,000, though Saleh himself claims 10,000 men under arms. By 22 August 2021, Ahmad Massoud claimed to have gathered about 9,000 fighters and at least a "handful of armoured humvees" in the valley.

The republican forces in Panjshir organized as National Resistance Front of Afghanistan (NRF). Within the NRF, there were differences between the forces loyal to Saleh and those loyal to Ahmad Massoud, as the former is hardcore anti-Taliban and anti-Pakistani, whereas the latter maintained good relations with Pakistan which was supportive of the Taliban. As a result, Massoud was more willing to negotiate with the Taliban. By 22 August, the resistance also confirmed that several local militias had begun to fight the Taliban on their own, independent of the Panjshir-based forces. According to Yasin Zia, the resistance has already secured access to five helicopters formerly used by the Afghan military. The NRF was greatly weakened by the fall of most of Panjshir to Taliban troops in September 2021, though the group continued to operate and expanded its activity across northern Afghanistan over the next months. By April 2022, the NRF was estimated to field a few thousand fighters, split into several branches such as the Andarab Resistance Front.

Other pro-republican insurgent groups emerged after the fall of Panjshir. These included the "Ahmad Khan Samangani Front", Afghanistan Freedom Front, "Afghanistan Islamic National & Liberation Movement", the "High Council of National Resistance", the "Freedom Corps", "Liberation Front of Afghanistan", "Soldiers of Hazaristan", the "Freedom and Democracy Front", the "Wolf Unit", "National Front for Free Afghanistan", and the "Turkestan Freedom Tigers".

Islamic Emirate of Afghanistan

An estimate by the Combating Terrorism Center at the US Military Academy made prior to the fall of Kabul estimated the strength of the Taliban, throughout the whole of Afghanistan, at 60,000 armed cadre supported by up to 200,000 irregulars. Due to the rapid capitulation of the Afghan National Army, the Taliban have since acquired substantial materiel of US manufacture, including armored vehicles and combat aircraft. The Taliban remain a movement consisting of many different sub-groups whose aims, strategies, beliefs, and loyalties vary.

By March 2022, the armed Forces of the Islamic Emirate of Afghanistan had become increasingly professional, reorganized into corps and deploying their own air force -consisting of helicopters- in combat against the republican rebels.

Timeline
 Emergence of Panjshir resistance and first anti-Taliban revolts 

Around 17 August 2021, remnants of the Afghan National Army began massing in the Panjshir Valley at the urging of Massoud, along with local civilians who had responded to his mobilization calls. At the time, the Panjshir Valley was—according to one observer—"under siege on all sides" but had not come under direct attack. On 18 August, the number of admissions for war injuries was increasing at the Emergency Surgical Centre for War Victims in Anaba in Panjshir. By 22 August, Ahmad Massoud's forces were mostly focused on defending Panjshir as well as training.

On 17 August, a negotiated end to the political impasse had been attempted, with Saleh calling for a "peace deal" with the Taliban. On 18 August, the possibility of including the Taliban in a coalition government was raised by a top Afghan diplomat as a means of ending the stalemate.

On 18 August, local sources from Parwan Province reported that Saleh's forces had taken Charikar from Taliban fighters stationed in the area. In addition, there are reports of gunfights taking place near Salang Pass. On the following day, videos were released which showcased local fighters with flags of the old, anti-Taliban Northern Alliance parading through the streets of Charikar.

On 20 August, anti-Taliban fighters reportedly recaptured Andarab, Puli Hisar and Dih Salah districts in Baghlan Province with the Taliban claiming 15 of its soldiers had been killed, while other sources reported that up to 60 Taliban fighters were killed or injured, and two dozen captured. The three districts had reportedly experienced a revolt, led by a local police chief, after Taliban had conducted unpopular house-to-house searches. Bismillah Khan Mohammadi announced the operational success of the districts being recaptured via Twitter.

Audiovisual reports of the events circulated on social media and were reported by Pajhwok Afghan News. Later on the 20th, it was reported that the forces, led by Abdul Hamid Dadgar, had recaptured Andarab, though the Taliban had not yet commented.

On 21 August, it was reported that Panjshir representatives were meeting with Abdullah Abdullah and Hamid Karzai, members of the Coordination Council, to "discuss the current situation and ways of providing security to Afghans".

A source within the Panjshir resistance consequently confirmed their involvement in the operations in Baghlan Province, and stated that they planned on seizing a northern highway which could allow them to link up with Tajikistan and Uzbekistan. Taliban social media accounts called the counteroffensive a "betrayal" of the amnesty the Taliban had offered. It was reported on 22 August 2021 that Taliban fighters had been sent to the Keshnabad area of Andarab in order to kidnap the children of anti-Taliban forces.

On 22 August, the Russian Embassy in Afghanistan was reportedly asked by a Taliban representative to reach out to Panjshir-based leaders to possibly mediate. Meanwhile, resistance spokesman Ali Maisam Nazary informed the Agence France-Presse that Ahmad Massoud's group would prefer a peaceful resolution of the conflict, under the condition that a future government implemented a system of "decentralisation" and "equal rights" across the country. On 23 August, Taliban spokesman Zabihullah Mujahid said that while Taliban fighters are being sent to Panjshir, the Taliban are willing to seek peaceful means to end the conflict.

Simultaneously, the Taliban gave the opposition forces a four-hour ultimatum to surrender. In a statement to Al Arabiya, Massoud rejected the ultimatum. In response, the Taliban announced "hundreds" of its forces had been dispatched to the Panjshir Valley. It was reported on 23 August that talks between Taliban representatives and Panjshir leaders had broken down. Ali Maisam Nazary, spokesman for the resistance, said that the Taliban made demands for Massoud to accept no elections with a centralized government, which Massoud rejected as he wanted a future government to be decentralized, with respect for civil and semi-autonomy rights.

An unidentified Taliban spokesperson proclaimed in a statement that "hundreds of Mujahideen of the Islamic Emirate are heading towards the state of Panjshir to control it, after local state officials refused to hand it over peacefully". It was reported that on 23 August, Taliban commander Qari Fashihuddin was tasked to lead offensive operations in Panjshir. The Taliban reported that several of their fighters were killed and others wounded in ambushes in Jabal Siraj.

On 23 August, the Taliban claimed to have recaptured all 3 districts in Baghlan that fell to the resistance forces a week ago: Dih Salah District, Pul-e-Hisar and Andarab. A Taliban district chief stationed in Andarab was reported to be killed in the fighting. On 24 August, Panjshir resistance fighters reportedly retook control of Banu and Dih Salah districts, while Puli Hisar remained under Taliban control. Saleh publicly warned via Twitter that Taliban fighters in Andarab were blocking humanitarian assistance for civilians trying to escape from the fighting and called it a "humanitarian disaster". On the following day, Massoud's forces claimed to have ambushed a Taliban convoy in Andarab, destroying a critical bridge and inflicting heavy losses on the Islamists.

On 24 August, Major Wazir Akbar, an ex-Afghan commando who joined the Panjshir-based resistance fighters, reported an attempted Taliban incursion at Anjuman Pass through Badakhshan province, which was repelled with heavy Taliban casualties.

 Ceasefire and sporadic clashes 
On 26 August 2021, a ceasefire was declared with the Taliban and the resistance entering into talks. Taliban spokesman Zabihullah Mujahid said that he was "80 percent confident of a solution without war in the Panjshir Valley". On 29 August, Panjshir representatives stated that there were no Taliban fighters trying to enter Panjshir, refuting information from Anaamullah Samangani, who is a member of the Taliban's Cultural Commission. On 1 September, it was reported that ceasefire talks failed.

On 26 August, according to a video published by Global Defense Corp, heavy fighting had broken out between anti-Taliban fighters in Panjshir Valley and the Taliban. It was reported that more than 200 Taliban fighters were driven out the Panjshir Valley, with some being captured by anti-Taliban forces. The National Resistance Front (NRF) was also able to capture Pol-e-Hesar, Deh Salah and Banu districts.

On 28 August, Panjshir fighters engaged Taliban fighters in Sanjan, Kapisa and in Khost Wa Fereng, Baghlan in response to allegations of ceasefire violations conducted by Taliban fighters in the area.

On 29 August, internet and telecommunication services throughout Panjshir province were shut down on orders from the Taliban.

On 30 August, Panjshir fighters ambushed Taliban fighters attempting to break into Panjshir from Andarab.

 Taliban offensive and revolts in central Afghanistan 

On 31 August 2021, Taliban fighters commenced an offensive against the National Resistance Front in the provinces of Baghlan, Panjshir, and Parwan. Anti-Taliban sources claimed that the offensive involved al-Qaeda troops, a statement backed by videos in which pro-Taliban fighters were heard speaking non-native or locally uncommon languages such as Arabic. Sources reported that the offensive started when Taliban fighters were spotted entering Gulbahar and blocked the main road with a container. Taliban forces retook Dih Saleh District in Baghlan, allowing them to directly attack Panjshir. An initial Taliban assault through Khawak Pass connecting the Baghlan and central Panjshir Provinces failed. NRFA spokesperson Fahim Dashty said that the attack was likely done to test the area's defenses. Taliban troops also began to attack southern Panjshir from Gulbahar, resulting in heavy fighting. Despite being numerically superior to the defenders, the Taliban failed to break through. A refugee interviewed later by Al Jazeera stated that the Taliban had blocked roads out of Panjshir using shipping containers during their offensive, and the shutdown of internet connections and mobile phone services left residents unable to learn what was happening in other places.

On 1 September, a day after clashes at the entry points of the valley were reported, Mullah Amir Khan Motaqi, the head of the Taliban's commission for guidance & encouragement stated over a Twitter audio message to the people of Panjshir that attempts at reaching a negotiated settlement were "unfortunately all in vain." He lay the blame with the leadership of the resistance in Panjshir, saying there are still some people in the valley who "don't want the problems to be solved peacefully." He went on to say that Taliban has selected a native of the province as their desired governor. Despite the Taliban shutdown of Panjshir's internet, Fahim Dashti, the spokesperson for the Panjshir Resistance managed to conduct an interview with BBC Persian, in which he stated that the negotiations failed because of a fundamental difference of goals between the two sides. According to him, Panjshir resistance had the intention of extracting commitments and guarantees protecting freedoms and human and political rights of ethnic and religious minorities as well as women, but Taliban's goal in the negotiation was not to negotiate such guarantees, but to negotiate the extent of participation of the Panjshir opposition in a Taliban-led government that would satisfy the resistance.

On 2 September, Panjshir sources claimed that 13 Taliban fighters were killed in an ambush in Chikrinow district. Even though the offensive had stalled by this point, a Taliban spokesman said the valley was surrounded in all four directions and that a Panjshir resistance 'victory was impossible' as well as claiming Taliban territorial gains. Meanwhile, the Taliban claimed to have pushed into the Shotul district of Panjshir, but provided no firm proof for this claim. Analysts judged that the Taliban had probably advanced for a short time before being pushed back again. A minor Taliban attack on Anjuman Pass in northern Panjshir was reportedly easily repelled by Afghan commandos. In addition, local anti-Taliban forces from Andarab claimed to have retaken the crucial Khawak Pass.

Meanwhile, revolts had erupted in Wardak Province and Daikundi Province which are home to many Hazaras, an ethnic group which had been previously discriminated against by the Taliban. The Taliban had begun reaching out to the Hazara community in the months leading up to their takeover, promising to respect their rights and traditions. Accordingly, the situation in Wardak and Daikundi is complex, as local militia leaders had aided the Taliban takeover despite the disapproval of much of the population. In Daikundi's Khadir District, a revolt erupted as the pro-Taliban Hazara commander Muhammad Ali Sedaqat was ordered to disarm locals, with some fearing that the disarmament was not properly recorded and would expose locals to harassment by the Taliban. Fighting consequently broke out between the Taliban, pro-republic Hazaras, and pro-Taliban Hazaras. Local militias began to ambush Taliban troops.

On 3 September, the Taliban claimed to have captured Panjshir valley, however these claims were described as lies and propaganda by the local resistance leaders such as Saleh as well as international spectators. A NRF spokesperson stated that the situation was "difficult", but also that a Taliban push into the valley had resulted in the encirclement of a few hundred Taliban fighters. By the following day, heavy fighting was confirmed to be still continuing in the valley, with Paryan District reportedly being contested. An Italian medical aid organisation operating in the area confirmed that the Taliban had advanced up to Anaba; the Taliban claimed to have seized the districts of Khenj and Unabah. The NRF countered by claiming that they had managed to encircle even more Taliban troops, now numbering thousands, at Khawak Pass and Dashte Rewak.

On 5 September, both sides achieved some successes: The NRF was able to force hundreds of encircled Taliban fighters to surrender in the valley, with the NRF claiming to have captured up to 1,500. In turn, local journalists confirmed that the Taliban had taken both Rukha and Paryan Districts, while NRF spokesman Fahim Dashty was killed in combat. The Taliban also claimed to have advanced into Panjshir's capital Bazarak. A The Times reporter who accompanied the Taliban testified that much of the valley appeared to be under Islamist control at this point, although groups of NRF fighters continued to strike at the Taliban behind the frontlines. Massoud reacted to the Taliban advance by declaring on Facebook that he was endorsing offers by local religious leaders to negotiate a peaceful solution of the conflict. Pakistani journalist and regional expert Ahmed Rashid argued that the Taliban had clearly expressed that they would not "tolerate what [Massoud is] asking for, which is a semi-autonomous region in the Panjshir Valley". The Taliban leadership indeed rejected Massoud's negotiation offer, stating that it would only accept the NRF's surrender.

 Siege of the final Panjshir Valley holdouts and increasing exile activities 
On 6 September, after heavy fighting resulting in high losses on both sides, the Taliban captured the governor's office in Bazarak, and claimed control of the whole Panjshir Valley. The remaining NRF troops had reportedly retreated into the mountains, with the Taliban stating that many had fled the region. An NRF official then claimed Massoud was at a safe location, while Saleh escaped to Tajikistan. Ali Nazary, head of foreign affairs for the resistance group, said that Ahmed Massoud was still present inside Afghanistan. The NRF contested the Taliban's conquest of Panjshir, arguing that resistance fighters were still present in strategic positions in the valley, continuing their fight.

By 7 September, many civilians from Panjshir Valley had fled into the mountains to escape the Taliban, while Massoud made defiant statements and called for a large-scale, nation-wide uprising. The Panjshir locals were also threatened by starvation, as local supply remained cut-off. The remaining NRF troops were reportedly still resisting the Taliban in some areas. The NRF also claimed that the Taliban had begun to massacre local civilians.

As of 9 September, OSINT evidence analyzed by Bellingcat researchers shows that the Taliban continue to advance, and control territory at least  into the valley. The Taliban has placed the valley under siege, not allowing journalists or goods to enter, so the extent of their control is difficult to surmise. Panjshir residents who were able to reach Kabul warned that supplies in the province are being exhausted due to the blockade. NRF spokesman Ali Nazary claimed that the Taliban had not conquered all of Panjshir, but only the main road, which allowed them to capture nearby Bazarak as well. He stated that the resistance forces had made a tactical withdrawal from the main road, while retaining 60–65% of the sub-valleys and strategic positions under their control. Mohammad Zahir Aghbar, the Islamic Republic of Afghanistan's ambassador to Tajikistan, meanwhile stated that Massoud and Saleh were still in Afghanistan but  for security reasons and had not fled to Tajikistan, contrary to earlier reports.

By 10 September, the Taliban had captured the residence where Saleh had earlier been hiding and aired his latest video claiming he was still in Panjshir, with photos of a Taliban fighter posing at the same spot where Saleh had recorded the video, being posted on social media it was later claimed that Rohullah Saleh, Amrullah's brother, was killed while trying to escape the region. A three-day ceasefire was reported to be in effect, although not confirmed by any side. National Congress Party leader Abdul Latif Pedram meanwhile told TOLO News that NRF forces were present in all mountains of Panjshir. NRF commander Saleh Rigistani vowed that their forces will continue fighting, and added that the province was facing a shortage of food and medicinal supplies. Taliban Cultural Commission member Anaamullah Samangani however claimed that the NRF had no "public presence" in Panjshir and were hiding in caves and valleys, with talks for their surrender ongoing. Residents meanwhile complained that roads in Panjshir were blocked, while electricity and telecommunications were shut.

A tribal elder meanwhile stated on 10 September that the Taliban was blocking food supplies and carrying out extrajudicial executions of civilians, adding that eight civilians were reportedly killed by them on 7 September. Ahmad Wali Massoud also accused the Taliban of killing civilians and stated that the NRF still controlled "major areas" in Panjshir. Saleh's son Shuresh stated on 11 September that his father's brother Rohullah Azizi, who had been fighting for the resistance, had been executed alongside his driver on 9 September by the Taliban, after being stopped at a checkpoint in Khanez village of Panjshir.

Also on 11 September, Tasnim News Agency reporters were allowed into Panjshir. They met with a group of Red Unit Taliban fighters who claimed that all of Panjshir was captured and resistance forces may have taken shelter in nearby mountainous areas. They also claimed that the situation was calm despite the expiration of the reported ceasefire. Many civilians were seen fleeing the area fearing of renewed clashes. Reporters also interviewed a NRF supporter who blamed the Taliban for not establishing an inclusive government. He also claimed that the Pakistan Air Force had helped the Taliban.

An investigative report published by the BBC on 13 September found that the Taliban had executed at least 20 civilians in Panjshir since they entered the valley. Taliban spokesman Zabiullah Mujahid meanwhile denied the group had committed any human rights violation in the province. Agence France-Presse reporters allowed into Panjshir on 15 September found many villages in the three districts they visited nearly empty. Residents interviewed by them accused the Taliban of executing 19 civilians between the village of Khenj and Bazarak, and preventing civilians from fleeing the province in order to use them as human shields against attacks by resistance fighters. A doctor in Panjshir meanwhile told Al Jazeera that all hospitals in the province had been closed or were operating on limited supplies, except for an Italian-run emergency hospital.

Journalists of The New York Times allowed into Panjshir on 13 September reported that fighting had mostly ceased, as the Taliban controlled much of the valley and the NRF was apparently limited to the nearly inaccessible mountain areas. Some local forces had also left the NRF without surrendering to the Taliban, instead acting as autonomous self-defense groups and controlling parts of the valley. In late September, a United States intelligence official, a US Department of Defense consultant, and two former Afghan government officials confirmed that Massoud and Saleh had fled to Tajikistan shortly after the Taliban took control of most of the valley. Massoud was relocated to a safe house in Dushanbe and Saleh to a nearby location. Regional experts argued that the reports of the exile of the NRF leadership were reliable and believable. Massoud, Saleh, Pedram, and others were reportedly attempting to organize further anti-Taliban resistance from Tajikistan. However, researchers judged their future prospects to be poor, as Tajikistan was supportive of them but probably unwilling to risk cross-border fighting, while the Taliban had managed to gain much international support, entrenching their position. Despite these reports, the NRF continued to claim that its leaders were still in Panjshir, and that the insurgency was continuing.

On 6 October, Abdul Latif Pedram claimed that guerilla warfare continues in Panjshir. TASS reported heavy fighting at Zamankur, Anaba District. By early November 2021, analyst Jacob Zenn argued that there were no more militant forces loyal to Massoud operating in Afghanistan, while the NRF continued its efforts to reorganize an insurgency. The government of Tajikistan was still hosting and supporting the remnants of the anti-Taliban political opposition, although more so to improve its image abroad and domestically than to actually influence the situation in Afghanistan. At this point, the only substantial armed resistance to the Taliban government was offered by the Islamic State's Khorasan Province (IS-KP). Analyst Jacob Zenn argued that IS-KP's insurgency was growing and could potentially allow pro-republican forces to make a comeback as the Taliban and the Islamic State were focused on fighting each other. However, some NRF holdouts continued to be active in Panjshir. On 15 October, Russian news agency Interfax reported NRF forces conducting a guerilla attack in Andarab, Baghlan, with Taliban losses being reported as six killed, four wounded, and two being captured by pro-NRF forces. At the same time, fighting was also reported in Balkh, with both sides suffering unknown casualties. Around late October, a visit by Radio Télévision Suisse into Bazarak would report an armed confrontation between the Taliban and pro-NRF forces occurring in an undisclosed location in the mountains surrounding Bazarak. The latter reportedly gained the upper hand with unknown casualties on both sides, thus confirming that the NRF is still active near Bazarak and in Panjshir despite claims of inactivity by local Taliban officials.

 Guerrilla campaign by the NRF and other groups 
On 12 November 2021, clashes between republicans and Taliban forces took place at Khoshudara, located in Baghlan Province's Khost wa Fereng District. Both sides suffered several losses. A local informed The Independent that the NRF still held settlements in Khost wa Fereng.

On 29 November, a clash between Taliban and pro-NRF forces reportedly occurred in Samangan Province, with reportedly two republican fighters killed and one wounded from the engagement. The Independent reported that according to local sources a militia of 400 men took control of the mountainous area of Tondruk including 10 villages, located between the Hazrati Sultan District and the provincial capital of Aybak. The same source reported that in October, local Taliban officials attempted to take over the area, although the attack was called off due to the harsh terrain of the region and the military readiness of the local pro-NRF militia. The Samangan militia became known as the "Ahmad Khan Samangani Front", and consisted of several groups which were loyal to a commander named Hekmatullah Tour. The group was not part of the NRF, though aligned with it.

On 6 and 7 December, NRF and Taliban forces clashed in the Hesa Duwum Kohistan District of Kapisa Province, with five Taliban militants killed or wounded, and two NRF killed (according to Mehr News Agency). Islamic World News had reported that according to local sources, NRF forces under the command of Hamed Seifi, General Kouhestani, General Hasibullah and General Munib Amiri, have been carrying out hit and run attacks against Taliban militants in the mountainous areas of Panjshir, Kapisa and Baghlan provinces. They also reported that an assassination of a Taliban member in the Kalafgan District of Takhar Province initially thought to have been carried out by ISKP, might have been perpetrated by the NRF, although the true perpetrators are yet to be confirmed.

On 20 December, a member of the NRF in Baghlan reported to The Independent that the local resistance attacked Taliban positions in the village of Kaftarkhaneh, with the Taliban being driven out of the village and suffering 8 casualties, with four killed and four more wounded. NRF spokesman Sibghatullah Ahmadi would go on to confirm the engagement, also stating that pro-resistance forces had conducted attacks in Badghis Province on the same day, with unknown casualties. The spokesman also claimed on 17 December that the NRF had conducted attacks in 14 Afghan provinces (Kabul, Kapisa, Samangan, Takhar, Parwan, Badghis, Laghman, Balkh, Faryab, Ghazni, Ghor, Herat, Nangarhar, and Kunar provinces), killing 61 Taliban fighters within the last 8 days, while allegedly suffering 43 casualties with one dead and 42 wounded, alleging that more pro-NRF guerilla organizations will "soon announce their presence".

On 26 December, hundreds of civilians from Anaba district, Panjshir went out to protest in response to the killing of Mohammad Agha by Taliban-affiliated militants. The victim was allegedly not associated with the National Resistance Front, however some reports stated that he served as a police officer in the previous Afghan government, who returned to his home believing in the promise of amnesty for those associated with the previous government given by the Taliban after the Fall of Kabul. Local Taliban officials confirmed the killing, claiming it was a misunderstanding, while promising to prosecute the perpetrators of the killing. In response to the killing, hundreds of civilians marched to the governor's office, chanting anti-Taliban slogans like "death to the Taliban" and "long live Ahmad Massoud". While the motives for the killing of Mohammad Agha have not been confirmed, the Taliban had been engaging in numerous summary executions and forced disappearances of former members of Afghan security forces, with the victim count being over 100 as of November, 2021, contrary to the promise of amnesty given to former government associates by the Taliban. The incident also allegedly occurred days after an attack conducted by the NRF in Panjshir against the Taliban. The deputy chief of security of Panjshir Abdul Hamid Khorasani was reported to have clashed with the protesters, although no casualties were reported.

 2022 
On 2 January 2022, The Independent reported that in the preceding few days, the Ahmad Khan Samangani Front clashed in the village of Kichi Manghar in the Hazrati Sultan district of Samangan, killing at least two members of the Taliban including a commander, while one of the militia's commanders was killed by the Taliban in the engagement. According to the source, a few hours after the end of the clash, Taliban forces attacked the village of Kichi Mungar and killed two of Abdul Halim's relatives who were not associated with the militia. There were also reports of fighting between the NRF and the Taliban in the Ishkamish District, Takhar Province, with one Taliban and one NRF member being killed in the village of Elich during the clashes. The Taliban has so far refused to comment on the attack.

Talks between NRF and Taliban representatives were held in Tehran, Iran on 8 and 9 January, but were ultimately unproductive. On 12 January, Taliban security forces arrested Makhdum Alem, a long-time Uzbek Taliban commander. This sparked protests and a short-lived revolt at Maymana, as his supporters temporarily seized the city. After four days of negotiations, the uprising ended and the locals reaccepted Taliban rule, although Alem remained under arrest. Observers believed the short-lived revolt was a sign of the remaining tensions between the northern ethnic groups and the Pashtun-dominated Taliban, with even Uzbek as well as Tajik Taliban suspicious of the government.

On 21 January, the Taliban leadership announced that its security forces had killed eight resistance fighters in a clash in Balkh Province, and seized their munitions. Three days later, a battle between the NRF and Taliban erupted in Baghlan's Khost wa Fereng District. Both sides lost several fighters, with the Taliban reportedly trying to arrest suspected pro-NRF civilians and besieging the village of Kazar. By the end of January, local media claimed that NRF guerrillas were still operating and occasionally attacking Taliban groups in the provinces of Baghlan, Balkh, Badakhshan, and Faryab. In contrast, combat was no longer reported in Panjshir at the time.

On 13 February, a group affiliated with the NRF announced its existence in Farah Province, one of the first pro-NRF groups to emerge in a predominantly Pashtun province. It is commanded by Idris Mobarez, who is the son of Mohammad Salim Mobarez, a former commander of Ahmad Shah Massoud. Around that time, the NRF had increased its attacks against the Taliban. On 19 February, fighting resumed in Panjshir as NRF-aligned forces launched a missile attack into Darah, while pro-NRF troops located in the mountains of Panjshir clashed with local Taliban forces. The latter confirmed the engagement, but did not provide any further details. At the same time, local Afghan media had reported that the Taliban had launched air and ground attacks against resistance positions in the Andarab District, with unknown casualties.

On 16 February, the Afghanistan Islamic National & Liberation movement announced its existence, which is believed to be the only Pashtun-led anti-Taliban insurgent group so far. It is led by former Afghan Army special forces commander Abdul Mateen Sulaimankhail. On 13 April, in an interview with the Afghanistan International TV network, Sulaimankhail claimed his group was engaged in "military and political activities" in 26 out of Afghanistan's 34 provinces, although researchers questioned that claim. The group was most likely responsible for the assassination of Taliban commander Maulvi Hanzala in Lashkargah, Helmand Province on 13 March.

On 12 March, a new anti-Taliban insurgent and civil group, the Afghanistan Freedom Front (AFF), had emerged, after reports of its existence started circulating in early February 2022. The group is separate from the National Resistance Front of Afghanistan, and mainly composed of former Afghan soldiers. As of early March, the AFF had already launched ambushes in Baghlan, Kapisa, Parwan, and Panjshir, with the Taliban reportedly using heavy weapons and air operations to suppress AFF-aligned resistance cells.

On 22 April, two people including the nephew of Atta Muhammad Nur were killed in a firefight in Balkh against local Taliban forces. This incident was possibly connected to the emergence of the High Council of National Resistance, a rebel group which was reportedly led by Nur, and backed by many former anti-Taliban warlords and politicians such as Abdul Rashid Dostum, Muhammad Mohaqiq, and Abdul Rasul Sayyaf. The High Council received support from NRF leader Ahmad Massoud.

On 30 April, NRF forces led by Khari Mohammad Andarabi carried out attacks against Taliban bases in the villages of Taghanak and Paskundi in the Pul-e-Hesar district, in the Andharab region of Baghlan. Casualties were reported on both sides, with 11 Taliban fighters and one NRF commander, Sabzali Andarabi, killed in the fighting, according to Hasht-e Subh Daily. Over the preceding weeks, the NRF had carried out attacks across the northern provinces.

In May 2022, the NRF announced a new offensive against the Taliban in Panjshir.

 Rebellion in Balkhab and expanded NRF operations 

On 6 May 2022, the NRF launched an offensive, reportedly capturing three districts in Panjshir Province. The NRF spokesman Ali Nazary stated that the NRF had taken control of the three district's roads, villages, and outposts, after which they besieged the local Taliban offices. He also stated that "Many Taliban fighters have asked for time to surrender. The enemy has suffered heavy casualties." Taliban officials denied any fighting in the area. Local Panjshir residents reported heavy fighting during the night. The NRF also stated that the group would continue their presence across 12 provinces, mostly in the north. Approximately 30 Taliban fighters had been killed in the NRF offensive as of 12 May. The Taliban subsequently sent reinforcements from other provinces to bolster their garrisons in Panjshir. Fighting was concentrated at Abdullah Khel which the NRF temporarily seized before retreating. On 17 May, the first meeting of the Supreme Council of National Resistance took place in Ankara, Turkey with Abdul Rashid Dostum being involved.

On 31 May, four NRF fighters were executed by the Taliban in the Tagab District, Badakhshan, while destroying an NRF hideout in the district according to Taliban security officials.

By early June, NRF guerrilla attacks in Panjshir were taking place "regular[ly]"  or "nearly daily". Despite the growing number of losses on both sides, the Taliban still claimed that there was no more resistance in the valley, even as they sent up to 10,000 reinforcements to strengthen their positions in Panjshir. The NRF claimed that it had expanded its operations into 12 provinces. However, researcher Roshni Kapur argued that the different anti-Taliban rebel groups were still too fractured and divided to pose an existential threat to the Taliban government.

On 10 June, local sources reported heavy clashes in the Karaman valley area in Dara District, Panjshir between the NRF and the Taliban, after the latter attacked several positions of the former. It occurred after a "two-day break" in the fighting. No casualties were reported in that instance. Two days prior, a clash occurred in the Paryan district, Panjshir, with reportedly 20 Taliban fighters and one NRF fighter killed.

On 11 June 2022, a Hazara Taliban commander, Mehdi Mujahid, rebelled against the Islamic Emirate, citing anti-Hazara policies by the Taliban. As Mehdi Mujahid's forces controlled Balkhab District, the entire district consequently passed under insurgent control. Pro-republican forces, including the NRF, voiced support for Mehdi Mujahid's forces. In the following weeks, Taliban forces repeatedly attempted to retake Balkhab, but were repelled. On 16 June 2022, the NRF shot down a Taliban Mil Mi-17 in the Arezoo valley. During the shootdown of the helicopter, NRF fighters killed two Taliban fighters and captured four more. By 25 June, according to anti-Taliban sources, Mehdi Mujahid's forces had surrounded "hundreds of Taliban fighters" in the Bakhlab district, with dozens of Taliban fighters killed or wounded during the preceding days. By the end of June, NRF attacks were confirmed in Badakhshan, Kabul, Panjshir, Kapisa, and Takhar Provinces. The Taliban imposed a blockade on Kohistan District, Kapisa, as the NRF had launched an offensive there. Besides Mehdi Mujahid's rebellion, clashes between different Taliban factions were also reported in Baghlan, Bamyan, and Faryab Provinces.

Between 16 and 17 June, the Taliban carried out multiple operations against NRF bases in Rokha, Anaba, and Shotul districts. In the Chamalwarda area of Rokha district alone, 51 Taliban fighters were killed or wounded, while two NRF fighters were killed and another wounded.

On 22 June, an audio tape was published in which the Taliban acting minister of defence Mullah Yaqoob mentioned that several Taliban outposts in the Khavash valley in the Khost wa Fereng District were evacuated and capture by NRF forces, while complaining about the Taliban's purported lack of obedience and organization.

On 8 July, NRF fighters engaged Taliban forces in the Khost district, Baghlan and took control of several areas. On 10 July, NRF forces attacked a Taliban outpost in Baghlan, killing two Taliban fighters and destroying a military vehicle.

Sometime around early July, the Taliban captured Golwarz village near Bakhlab as part of a general campaign against the Bakhlab insurgents. Several war crimes were reportedly committed by the Taliban against the mostly Hazara population throughout the campaign, causing refugees to flee to neighboring provinces.

Starting on 13 July, the Taliban and the NRF clashed in the Khenj and Shotul Districts of Panjshir. On 16 July, a planned offensive by the Taliban in the Arzoo valley of the Shotul district was met with an NRF counterattack led by Haseeb Qowai Markaz, which resulted in 12 Taliban dead and 9 wounded. This came after the Taliban had reportedly launched several attacks on NRF positions in the valley, only to be repelled by NRF forces.

On 16 July, fighting flared up in the Qasan valley of Andarab as part of a series of clashes in Baghlan province. By the next day, the Taliban reportedly lost 17 fighters with 10 more injured, while NRF casualties were not reported besides three being injured. Fighting would continue up to 21 July, during which Taliban fighters committed war crimes including beheading a 17-year-old boy despite no confirmed affiliation with any resistance group.

On 20 July, the Taliban launched an offensive against NRF positions in Warsaj District, Takhar province, reportedly gathering over 300 fighters for the job. On 23 July, according to Iranian state-owned news Pars Today, the Taliban discovered and confiscated an ammunition warehouse in Varsaj District, Takhar province.

On 25 July, NRF forces based in Kapisa province attacked Taliban positions in the Kohistan District, reportedly killing three Taliban fighters and wounding two. On 27 July, a senior NRF member had announced that it had carried out an offensive against a Taliban base in the Kalahan village, Kapisa on the night of 26 July. According to the NRF, five Taliban members were killed and one was wounded in the attack.

On 10 August, fighting flared up in Panjshir between the NRF and Taliban, with the latter reportedly losing 25 fighters, while no casualties were reported for the NRF side.

On 15 August, the one year anniversary since the fall of Afghanistan, the NRF launched an offensive in Panjshir, reportedly capturing seven villages in the Bazarak, Dara, Annaba, Shotul, Paryan, and Khenj districts, while surrounding Taliban fighters in several positions. Up to 40 Taliban fighters were captured in the Dara district, a statement which was backed by former Vice President Amrullah Saleh. By 16 August, 58 Taliban fighters were reportedly killed, with another 12 wounded, while casualty figures for the NRF were not reported. At the same time, the Taliban launched an operation in the Ishkashim District, Takhar, only to be besieged by the NRF in the village of Anjiristan on 15 August. On the next day, clashes occurred in the Ishkashim and Chal Districts, with the Taliban reportedly suffering heavy casualties according to the NRF. In the previous two weeks, the NRF had reportedly carried out several offensive attacks in the Farkhar District.

On 17 August, the Hazara anti-Taliban rebel Mehdi Mujahid was captured and executed by the Taliban in the Kohsan District of Herat Province, who was reportedly attempting to travel to Iran prior to his execution.

On 18 August, the NRF and Taliban clashed in the Taghanak village of Pul-e-Hesar district in Baghlan, resulting in 10 Taliban fighters killed and 8 wounded. At the same time, more NRF-Taliban clashes reportedly occurred in the Qeshlaq village of the Rustaq District of Takhar province, in which a local member of the Taliban intelligence was killed. Simultaneously, a fight broke out in the Raghistan District of Badakhshan, with the Taliban claiming three NRF killed.

On 19 August, the NRF reportedly attacked a Taliban checkpoint in the Darah District of Panjshir, resulting in 10 Taliban fighters killed according to the NRF.

On 21 August, Abdul Qayyum Zakir was appointed as the military commander of Panjshir province. Long War Journal notes that Zakir appointment to lead the fight against National Resistance Front (NRF) in Panjshir and the district of Andarab is a clear indication that the NRF is challenging the Taliban's primacy in central and northern Afghanistan. At the same time, several local sources had reported that the Taliban had converted 32 schools across Panjshir into military bases, likely as a result of the increased clashes in Panjshir. On the same day, the NRF claimed that 7 Taliban members were killed and 5 others wounded as a result of a Taliban convoy hitting a roadside mine in the Rukha district of Panjshir.

On 6 September 2022, the Taliban mobilized 500 fighters from Herat to be deployed in Panjshir. Young people in Jowzjan were paid by the Taliban to fight against the NRF.

On 10 September, there were gunfights between NRF and Taliban forces in Hesarak, Parian, Abshar, Dara and Hessa I districts. Taliban forces in Paryan have told villagers to leave.

On 14 September, the Taliban claimed to have killed 40 rebels during an anti-insurgency operation in the province.

In mid-September, a video was released by Taliban militants showing the execution of at least 27 men, allegedly captured rebels somewhere in Panjshir. Afghan Witness (AW) - an open-source project based in the United Kingdom opened an investigation into the mass execution.

On 21 September, a Taliban attack on an anti-Taliban base in Yakawlang district of Bamyan and Balkhab was repulsed by fighters under Mohammad Tahir Zahir with reports of four Taliban fighters wounded.

On 13 December, the NRF reported three commanders were captured by Taliban fighters due to one of their own fighters having links with the Taliban government.

On 26 December, NRF forces in Andarab repelled attacks from Taliban in Taghanak, Khej and Bagh Dara villages, with unconfirmed reports of casualties on both sides, which included NRF commander Khair Mohammad Andrabi. The NRF released statements to condemn Andarabi's death, who was killed while holding off a Taliban advance.

On 25 January 2023, NRF forces attacked a Taliban camp in Kapisa, killing three fighters and wounding two with no casualties from the NRF.

 Foreign involvement 
Neutral
As of 23 August 2021, there was no public support for the resistance from the international community. At the start of the conflict, the US and other potential allies were focused on the concurrent Kabul airlift, which required the Taliban's cooperation. Massoud's op-ed in The Washington Post requesting Western support may be evidence of a lack of enthusiasm (for the resistance) in the US government.

On 21 August, former Indian Chief of the Army Staff Shankar Roychowdhury said that the Government of India must reach out to Panjshir-based resistance forces alongside Taliban factions that may be friendly to India.

Pro-NRF
On 25 August 2021, Bilal Y. Saab, an ex-Pentagon senior advisor, and Mick Mulroy, former Deputy Assistant Secretary of Defense for the Middle East, Marine veteran and ex-CIA Special Activities Center operator, argued in a Time editorial that Washington, D.C. should provide support in Afghanistan by allowing the CIA to station its officers with counterterrorism responsibilities to secretly assist anti-Taliban resistance groups. U.S. senator Lindsey Graham and representative Michael Waltz advocated for giving NRF support so that they can hold their ground against the Taliban after they captured Kabul.

On 27 August, Tajiks from Kulob, Tajikistan volunteered to prepare to fight against the Taliban, despite warnings from Tajik officials that it can be deemed illegal. In an interview on 2 September, Erika Simpson, president of the Canadian Peace Research Association, said that it was potentially risky for a country to publicly support the resistance from inside Afghanistan and suggested that it was better to support anti-Taliban resistance groups based overseas.

On 6 September, Iran's Foreign Ministry spokesman Saeed Khatibzadeh strongly condemned the Taliban assault on the Panjshir Valley. On 10 September, a road named Panjshir Alley in Tehran was officially named and approved by the Tehran City Council.

In mid-September 2021, in a move aimed at increasing inclusivity in the Taliban government, 20 European Parliament members filed a motion to invite NRF leader Ahmad Massoud to address the European Council and the EP, just as his father did 20 years earlier.

 Pro-Taliban 
Following the death of Fahim Dashti, a journalist with the Afghanistan National Journalists Union and spokesperson for the National Resistance Front, officials from the NRF accused Pakistan of aiding the Taliban and stated that Dashti had died in a drone strike carried out by the Pakistan Air Force. The former parliamentary representative of Samangan Province, Zia Arianjad reiterated the claim to the Iranian Aamaj News, stating that PAF was assisting the Taliban in Panjshir with drone strikes using smart bombs. According to defense analyst Babak Taghvaee, Pakistan was using CH-4 drones to assist the Taliban in Panjshir. Faiz Hameed, the head of the Inter-Services Intelligence, the military intelligence agency of Pakistan, had visited Kabul prior to Dashti's death, to assist the Taliban in reorganising the Afghan military according to a senior Pakistani official.

Tajuden Soroush, a correspondent with Iran International, stated that Kamaluddin Nezami, the governor of Panjshir, had told him that drones were used to target the resistance on several occasions. Fox News reported that a CENTCOM source had identified Pakistani special forces accompanied with drone strikes were assisting the Taliban. Republican Congressman Adam Kinzinger stated that if the report were confirmed then the United States should sanction Pakistan for creating and protecting the Taliban. According to the Austrian public broadcaster Österreichischer Rundfunk, the reports are unconfirmed. The Taliban denied the claim that Dashti had died in a drone strike, and the Pakistani Foreign Office has rejected the reports that allege Pakistani involvement in Panjshir.

Analysis
Shortly after the fall of Kabul, journalists Carlotta Gall and Adam Nossiter wrote in The New York Times'' that the international community would be in a bind if they showed some form of support for the resistance because of the airlift operations that were then ongoing. Abdul Matin Beyk suggested that other anti-Taliban forces were waiting to see if the Panjshir-based fighters would either resist to the end or keep considering negotiations with Taliban representatives. He suggested that their successes could inspire others to do the same.

Analysts Bill Roggio and Andrew Tobin speculated that the eventual success of the Taliban offensive against the Panjshir Valley in early September 2021 might have been related to the previous attempts of the NRF to expand into neighbouring districts. Accordingly, the NRF would have been overextended and had not prepared its defences well enough.

See also
 War in Afghanistan (2001–2021)
 2021 Taliban offensive
 2021–2022 Afghan protests
 2021 anti-Pakistan protests

Notes

References

Works cited 
 

Panjshir Province
2021 in Afghanistan
Conflicts in 2021
Conflicts in 2022
Afghanistan conflict (1978–present)
August 2021 events in Afghanistan
September 2021 events in Asia